Rakhshandeh E'tesami (Raḵšanda Eʿteṣāmī; 1907 – April 4, 1941), better known as Parvin E'tesami, was an Iranian 20th-century Persian poet.

Life

Parvin E'tesami was born in 1907 in Tabriz to parent, Mirza Yussef E'tesami Ashtiani (E'tesam-al-Molk). Her paternal grandfather was Mirza Ebrahim Khan Mostawfi Etesam-al-Molk. Her grandfather Mirza Ebrahim Khan Mostawfi Etesam-al-Molk was originally from Ashtiyan, but moved to Tabriz and was appointed financial controller of the province of Azerbaijan by the Qajar administration.

E'tesami had four brothers, her mother died in 1973. Her family moved to Tehran early in her life, and in addition to the formal schooling, she obtained a solid understanding of Arabic and classical Persian literature from her father. At the age of 8 she started writing poems.

She studied at the Iran Bethel School in Tehran, an American high school for girls where she graduated in 1924. Afterwards, she taught for a while at that school. For her graduation she wrote the poem, A Twig of a Wish (1924) about the struggles facing Iranian women, their lack of opportunities and the need for their education.

In 1926, she received an invitation to become the tutor of the queen of the new Pahlavi court, but she refused.

On July 10, 1934, she was married to a cousin of her father, Fazlollah E'tesami, and they moved to the city of Kermanshah.  But the marriage only lasted for ten weeks and they separated due to differences of interests and personality and she returned to Tehran.

She was a member of the Kanoun-e-Banovan and supported the Kashf-e hijab reform against compulsory hijab (veiling). 

In 1936, E'tesami was awarded by Reza Shah Pahlavi the third-degree Iran Medal of Art and Culture, but she declined.

In 1938–39 she worked for several months at the library of Danesh-Saraay-e 'Aali, (currently known as Tarbiat Moallem University) of Tehran.

Her father died in 1938, and she died only three years later of Typhoid fever. She was buried near her father in Qom, near the Masumeh shrine.

Parvin E'tesami's house became an Iranian national heritage site on October 19, 2006.

Work 

E'tesami was around seven or eight years old when her poetic ability was revealed.  Through her father's encouragement, she versified some literary pieces which were translated from western sources by her father.  In 1921 to 1922, some of her earliest known poems were published in the Persian magazine Bahar (Spring).  The first edition of her Diwan (book of poetry) consisted of 156 poems and appeared in 1935.  The poet and scholar Mohammad Taqi Bahar wrote an introduction to her work. The second edition of her book, edited by her brother Abu'l Fatha E'tesami, appeared shortly after her death in 1941. It consisted of 209 different compositions in Mathnawi, Qasida, Ghazal, and Qet'a (another form of Persian poetry), and stanzaic forms.  It totaled 5606 distiches.

In her short life, she managed to achieve great fame amongst her fellow Iranians. E'tesami's poetry follows the classical Persian tradition, its form and its substance. She remained unaffected by or perhaps ignored the modernistic trends in Persian poetry. These works follower a didactic and philosophical styles of Sanai and Naser Khusraw. Several other Qasidas, particularly in the description of nature, show influences from the poet Manuchehri. There are also some Ghazals in her Diwan.

According to Professor Heshmat Moayyad, her Safar-e ashk (Journey of a tear) counts among the finest lyrics ever written in Persian.

Another form of poetry, the monazara (debate), claims the largest portions of E'tesami's Divan. She composed approximately sixty-five poems in the style of monazara and seventy-five anecdotes, fables, and allegories. According to Moayyad: "Parvin wrote about men and women of different social backgrounds, a wide-ranging array of animals, birds, flowers, trees, cosmic and natural elements, objects of daily life, abstract concepts, all personified and symbolizing her wealth of ideas. Through these figures she holds up a mirror to others showing them the abuses of society and their failure in moral commitment. Likewise, in these debates she eloquently expresses her basic thoughts about life and death, social justice, ethics, education, and the supreme importance of knowledge".

Parvin E'tesami began writing poetry from a young age; her first published works appeared in the Iranian magazine Baharin the early 1920s, when she was just a teenager. Throughout her life, E`tesami's work was a marriage of the traditional and modern; while her poetic style eschewed the new modernist styles and adhered closely to the forms and structures of classical Persian poetry.

See also

 Forough Farrokhzad
 Simin Behbahani
 Mina Assadi

References

Further reading

External links

 Poetry of Parvin E'tesami 
 Parvin E'tesami's biography, Iran Chamber Society

20th-century Iranian poets
1907 births
1941 deaths
Iranian women writers
Iranian writers
20th-century women writers
Poets from Tabriz
Iranian women poets
Deaths from typhoid fever
Burials at Fatima Masumeh Shrine